Nguyễn Đăng Quang (born 23 August 1963) is a Vietnamese billionaire businessman.

Quang is the co-founder and chairman of Masan Group, a consumer goods company best known for selling fish sauce, instant noodles, chili sauce, sausages, and animal feed.

Early life
Quang earned an MBA from the Plekhanov Russian University of Economics in Moscow, followed by a doctorate in technical sciences from the National Academy of Sciences of Belarus.

Career
Quang founded Masan in the 1990s.

Quang and his wife own 49% of the company's share, and his co-founder Hồ Hùng Anh, the vice chairman, owned 47.6% as of September 2015, although his holding as of January 2018 was not known.

Following a doubling of the share price in the six months to January 2018, Quang had a net worth of US$1.2 billion, according to Bloomberg L.P. He became Vietnam's third billionaire.

References

1963 births
Living people
Vietnamese billionaires
Vietnamese company founders
Vietnamese businesspeople
Plekhanov Russian University of Economics alumni
People from Quảng Trị province